What a Time to Be Alive is the debut studio album by Scottish singer-songwriter Tom Walker, released on 1 March 2019 through Relentless Records. It was preceded by the single "Leave a Light On", which reached the top 10 of the UK Singles Chart, as well as "My Way" and "Angels". It also includes "Walk Alone", released as a single from Rudimental's 2019 album Toast to Our Differences, and the original acoustic version of "Just You and I", which was re-released in a different version for single release in early 2019, also reaching the top 10 in the UK.

The album debuted atop the UK Albums Chart with first week sales of 37,000.

Background
Walker originally tweeted in July 2018 that the album would be released on 19 October 2018. On its delay, he said to Idolator that he felt like he had "been sat on this album for a little while". He also spoke about the title, and how it is either interpreted as being "depressing" or "hopeful", but that he named it "because we've come so far, the human race, but also, I think we keep making the same mistakes over and over again, and not learning sometimes. It's a thought provoking title, that's why I like it."

Critical reception

Writing for The Guardian, Alexis Petridis scored the album two out of five stars and called Walker "algorithmically designed for our times", comparing his sound to that of Ed Sheeran, in that the two share a "predilection for a percussive style of guitar playing, vaguely hip-hop beats and rap-influenced vocal cadences". Petridis also characterised the songwriting as either being "bullish assertions of Walker's own talent in the face of apathy and adversity ('I'll be dead before they change me, my guitar's the only one that ever paid me') and empathetic I'm-your-mate vignettes involving booze, drugs and lean times." Reviewing the album for Clash, Malvika Padin described it as "an assured, controlled debut album" featuring "a mix of slow instrumentals and soaring vocals, that make an impact track after track", summarising it as a "perfect representation of him – cheerful, genuine, heartfelt and talented". In a two-star review, Will Hodgkinson of The Times also compared Walker to Sheeran and Rag'n'Bone Man, saying that "the public appetite for earnest bearded troubadours who look as if they work in a microbrewery shows no sign of abating". Hodgkinson further noted that the album is "perfectly pleasant" but with its team of songwriters writing for mass audience appeal, "almost wilfully dull".

Track listing

Deluxe Edition
The deluxe edition of the album was released on 8 November 2019 and features the song "Better Half of Me", released on 4 October 2019.

Charts

Weekly charts

Year-end charts

Certifications

References

2019 debut albums
Albums produced by TMS (production team)
Albums produced by Jesse Shatkin
Albums produced by Mark Ralph (record producer)
Albums produced by Mike Spencer
Albums produced by Steve Mac